Calgary Transit is the public transit agency which is owned and operated by the city of Calgary, Alberta, Canada. In 2019, an estimated 106.5 million passengers boarded approximately 1,155 Calgary Transit vehicles. It operates light metro (LRT), urban tramway (in the downtown free-fare zone), bus rapid transit (BRT), para-transit, and regular bus services.

History 

What would eventually become Calgary Transit began as the Calgary Street Railway  on July 5, 1909, with twelve electric streetcars serving what was at the time a city of 30,000.
This streetcar service expanded throughout the next thirty years (including the Depression) until 1946, when the company was renamed to Calgary Transit System as electric trolleybus vehicles began replacing the local streetcars. Eventually the electric trolley lines were phased out together — to be replaced by diesel buses. In 1972, CTS assumed its current name of Calgary Transit.

Between the early 1970s and 2000, Calgary Transit had a three tier bus service. Standard bus routes were identified with white bus stop signs. Blue Arrow bus routes, marked by blue signs, provided limited stops, and all day service to suburban neighborhoods from the city centre. Express service was indicated with red signs and provided extremely limited bus service to the far reaches of the city during peak hours only. These tiers have been slowly phased out, since Calgary Transit began expanding CTrain lines and capacity and implementing BRT service. The last Blue Arrow route was cancelled in December, 2019. Express routes now appear side by side on the same signs as regular routes. MAX routes appear on a separate white and grey sign, while non-MAX BRT lines (routes 300, 301, 302, and 305) appear on red and white signs.

In 2012 Calgary Transit planners presented mayor Naheed Nenshi's council with a tentative 30-year plan 'RouteAhead' to enhance the capacities of Calgary Transit.

On December 13, 2012, Craig Hardy, became the one hundred millionth rider of the year. He received free transit for a year and was celebrated by mayor Nenshi.

CTrain light rail system 

On May 25, 1981, Calgary Transit became one of the first transit systems in North America (behind Edmonton LRT which opened in 1978) to operate a light rail system — the CTrain, on which construction had begun in 1978. The original line (referred to internally as the Red Line, and externally as Route 201) ran from Anderson station (just north of Anderson Road in the south end of the city) to 8th St SW in Downtown Calgary.

On April 27, 1985, a northeastern-bound line (Blue Line/Route 202) was opened, running from 8th St SW to Whitehorn station (just south of the intersection of McKnight Boulevard and 36th Street in the northeastern quadrant of the city), and on September 4, 1987, a northwestern-bound line (C-Line / part of Route 201) was opened in time for the 1988 Winter Olympics, running from downtown to University station (directly east of the University of Calgary campus, between 24th and 32nd Avenue on Crowchild Trail).

On September 3, 1990, a 1 km extension of the northwest line to Brentwood station (south of Brisebois Drive on Crowchild Trail) was opened; on October 9, 2001, two new stations — Canyon Meadows station (north of Canyon Meadows Drive and west of Macleod Trail) and Fish Creek–Lacombe station (south of Bannister Road and west of Macleod Trail) were added to the south line; on December 15, 2003, Dalhousie station (south of 53rd Street in the median of Crowchild Trail) was added to the northwestern line.

On June 28, 2004, two new stations for the south line opened: Shawnessy station (south of a brand new interchange at Macleod Trail and Shawnessy Boulevard) and Somerset–Bridlewood station (south of 162nd Avenue and just north of Shawville Gate).

On December 17, 2007, an extension was made to the Route 202 northeast line (first extension ever on the history of the line) from Whitehorn to the new McKnight–Westwinds station.;

On June 15, 2009, Crowfoot station was added on the northwest line located directly west of Crowfoot Town Centre in the median of Crowchild Trail.

On August 27, 2012, Martindale and Saddletowne stations were added to the northeast line, making the total of stations on this line to 10.

On December 10, 2012, the West LRT opened, with six new stations and Downtown West–Kerby station in downtown. Since it is Calgary's newest LRT line in 25 years, it is an extension of Route 202 (Blue Line).

Future extensions include the North Central line and the Southeast line (together running as the Green Line) running from North Pointe Bus Terminal, down Centre Street, through downtown, into the communities of Ogden, Douglasdale and McKenzie in the southeastern portion of the city, finally ending at the South Health Campus in Seton. Phase one of the North Central Line will travel from 16th Ave. north to Shepard, in the SE. The route will travel underground from 16th Ave N to 12 Ave. SW, and on an elevated guideway through Inglewood/Ramsay. Estimated travel time is 34 minutes. Construction started in 2018 on works to enable future rail construction.

On July 18, 2007, Calgary Transit officially unveiled a new red and white livery for its CTrain, articulated buses and every new bus or train coming into the system.

On August 27, 2008, a train en route to the Somerset station collided with a construction crane in between the Dalhousie and Brentwood stations. Six were injured in the accident, including one child.

On February 18, 2009, Calgary Transit celebrated the 1,000,000,000th rider, randomly selecting a passenger, Shelly Xiao during a ceremony at the 1 Street SW CTrain station.

Bus rapid transit 

On August 30, 2004, Calgary Transit opened a bus rapid transit line to operate future CTrain routes (the D-Line and an as-yet unplanned northbound line), using conventional buses until articulated buses entered service on June 25, 2007.  The BRT system consisted of a single route, Route 301, serving the northern and western parts of the city.  A subsequent route, Route 305, was added in 2008, serving the Bowness and 17th Avenue East corridors.  A third route, Route 302, entered service on August 31, 2009, along a proposed southeast LRT corridor.

The BRT is considered to be the successor to the Blue Arrow service introduced to the 1970s: both were a series of limited-stop routes that were to be intended to be replaced by LRT service in the future — however, the Blue Arrow service was never a true BRT (limited stop service, stopping at designated blue bus stop signs, was its only distinctive feature), the modern BRT includes priority at traffic signals, enhanced passenger waiting areas and offers a shorter travel time to the downtown with greater capacity articulated buses.  The Blue Arrow name all but disappeared in 2000 in order to unify all bus stops under one common scheme, but certain Blue Arrow routes are still in service to this day. In fact, Route 305 replaces a Blue Arrow route (Route 105).

On September 28, 2009, Council approved the Calgary Transportation Plan (CTP), fulfilling Council's priorities of "a city that moves." The CTP identified over 20 corridors that would serve as the city's future Primary Transit Network. These corridors laid the foundations of Calgary Transit's future BRT network. Preliminary functional studies were undertaken – specifically for 17 Avenue SE (2010) and the Southwest Transitway (2011) – to explore the feasibility of major transit capital projects for the near future. On January 11, 2011, Council approved the Bus Rapid Transit Network Plan, which outlined 11 BRT projects that the City plans to pursue in the short, medium, and long terms respectively.These plans included the introduction of 9 new BRT routes: the Airport BRT (short-long term), which would connect the Downtown Core with Calgary International Airport; the Southwest Transitway BRT (short-medium term), which would connect the Downtown Core with Mount Royal University (MRU) and Woodbine; the Southwest Crosstown BRT (short-medium term), which would connect Westbrook Station with MRU and Quarry Park; the North Crosstown BRT (medium term), which would connect Saddletowne Station with 16 Avenue N and the University of Calgary; the 17 Avenue SE Transitway BRT (medium-long term), which would connect the Downtown Core, Inglewood, 17 Avenue SE, towards the East City Limits; the 52 Street E BRT (medium term), which would connect Saddletowne and South Health Campus through the Southeast Industrial Area; the Sage Hill BRT (long term), which would connect Brentwood Station with the Sage Hill Transit Hub using the Shaganappi HOV; the 162 Avenue S BRT (long term), which would connect Somerset-Bridlewood Station with Providence; and the Southeast Crosstown BRT (long term), which would connect Somerset-Bridlewood Station with South Health Campus through Marquis of Lorne Trail. The plans also included enhancements of existing routes 301, 302, and 305.

The Airport BRT was actualised on July 27, 2011, with Route 300. This line was introduced after Calgary's Mayor promised to make the airport more accessible via public transit. On March 12, 2012, BRT service was cut significantly in Calgary. The 302 now run with shuttle buses, during off peak hours and weekends. The 305 does not run on weekends at all. These are both due to low ridership. The Southwest Crosstown BRT was actualised on December 10, 2012, with the Route 306. This route runs from Westbrook Station to Heritage Station, connecting MRU and Rockyview Hospital.

In December 2012, Council approved the RouteAhead Plan, which outlined the major transit capital projects the city would pursue for the next 30 years. RouteAhead identified the BRT routes Southwest Transitway, North Crosstown, Southwest Crosstown, 17 Avenue SE, 52 Street E, and Sage Hill (called Shaganappi HOV) as the key priorities for the city.

Plans not included in RouteAhead – like the 162 Avenue S BRT and the conversions of Route 300 and the 17 Avenue SE BRT into a LRT – were identified as projects to be conducted beyond the 30-year RouteAhead timeframe. RouteAhead also foreshadowed the plan of a new BRT route: the North Regional Context Study/144 Avenue N BRT (long term), which would connect Tuscany Station with the planned Stoney Station (Blue Line northeast extension), passing through communities north of 144 Avenue North and CrossIron Mills.

On November 19, 2018, Calgary's BRT network received an overhaul, and saw the introduction of three new lines. The new lines were incorporated under the MAX branding: MAX Orange (Route 303), connecting Brentwood Station with Saddletowne Station, passing through 16th Avenue N; MAX Teal (Route 306), connecting Westbrook Station with the Douglas Glen Transit Hub, passing through MRU, Rockyview Hospital, Heritage Station, and Deerfoot Meadows; and MAX Purple (Route 307), connecting the Downtown Core with East Hills, along a dedicated transitway along International Avenue (Deerfoot Trail to 52 Street SE). The former route 306 was reincorporated under MAX, and busses are now labelled as "MAX Teal." In order to make the new service unique from existing "BRT" routes, new stops now have heated shelters, real-time information, elevated sidewalks, and security cameras (for MAX Purple). MAX Purple is  the first service in Calgary to run on a dedicated transitway. In November 2019, the Southwest MAX line, renamed MAX Yellow, opened to the public. It is the second bus service in Calgary to operate in a dedicated transitway. This route runs from the Downtown Core to Woodbine, passing through MRU and 14 Street SW. As the Currie Barracks area of Calgary develops, the route will eventually be re-routed to serve that area.

Bus routes

Current service and fleet 

Calgary Transit operates 166 bus routes using 1,048 vehicles. All buses are low floor and wheelchair accessible. The light rail vehicle (LRV) fleet includes the system's original Siemens–Duewag U2 cars, 110 Siemens SD-160s, and 63 Siemens S200s. Calgary Transit's 72 original style SD160s were delivered in three orders between 2000 and 2007 and have all since been retrofitted with Air Conditioning and the newer red and white livery. In June 2010, 38 new restyled Siemens SD160s, featuring factory equipped AC and various cosmetic and technical changes over the previous series, began to arrive. In January 2016, the first of 63 Siemens S200 cars began arriving which entered service in July 2016.

The CTrain system along with several mainline bus routes provide the backbone of the system while many feeder bus routes and express services act to complement this backbone service. Service frequency on the CTrain and busier bus routes is typically from 5–30 minutes with operating hours of about 5 am – 2 am. Most feeder bus routes run at 15–45 minute intervals with similar operating hours on most routes and reduced on others. In addition there are many rush hour only services, some are feeder routes and some are express routes, these usually run 10–30 minutes apart.

Fares 
Calgary Transit currently operates as a single fare zone, with a flat rate fare for all standard service including bus, BRT, and the CTrain. As of January 2022, a single adult fare is $3.60, or $2.45 for youth. Books of 10 tickets are available at par to 10 fares. Monthly passes are also available, with youth passes for $79.00, and adult passes for $112.00. Seniors (65 and over) pay $150.00 for a yearly pass which is valid from July 1 to June 30 of the following year and which entitles them to travel at any time. Service on Christmas Day is free of charge. Starting New Year's Eve 2014, extended service until 3:00 a.m. on the CTrain and select bus routes requires regular fare.  In order to transfer from one transit vehicle to another, proof of fare from the CTrain, or a transfer from a bus is required.  A transfer or proof of fare is valid for 90 minutes from the time of issue, for any transit service (including stopovers). Fare inspections take place on the C-Train.

In cooperation with many of the post-secondary schools located in the city, a Universal Pass (U-Pass) program is offered to all students, paid as part of their tuition.

Detailed Fare Table:

Connect Card 
The "Connect Card" is the name of Calgary Transit's proposed electronic fare smart-card. After two years of work and after installing smart-card readers on every bus and at all CTrain stations that were supposed to start working in the summer of 2012, Calgary Transit cancelled the deal with its contractor, Spain-headquartered Telvent. The City of Calgary announced on November 8, 2012, that crews will remove the new smart-card machines out of all Calgary Transit 1,000 city buses and 160 LRT pay machines after repeated glitches and delays.
About one year later, the City then announced that they would relaunch the initiative, again with Telvent as the provider. In June 2015, the City of Calgary decided to scrap the Connect Card project and attempt to recover costs from Schneider Electric (formerly Telvent).

MyFare App 
In summer 2020, after a year-long trial, Calgary Transit rolled out its MyFare app for mobile devices, based on Masabi's Justride platform. The app, downloadable from normal app stores, allows users to purchase most types of fare media, either via an online account or as guests. Payment is charged to a debit or credit card. Once activated, the fare media is valid for the period specified in the attached terms and conditions. Users call up the media, then tap the device against a reader on buses; CTrain fare inspectors have portable readers. While the app is generally popular among riders, many resent the fact that single-ride tickets, if not activated, expire 7 days after purchase date.

Facilities 
There are six major Calgary Transit facilities to store and maintain the transit fleet, as well as run several operations departments to keep the system running:

 Spring Gardens Administrative Building/Garage: Conventional bus storage, administration, machine shop, body shop, heavy duty diesel mechanical shop, bus operator training, maintenance and equipment training
 Victoria Park Garage: Conventional, articulated and shuttle bus storage, body shop, call centre, heavy duty mechanical shop, bus and rail operations control centre, protective services
 Anderson Garage: Conventional bus storage, LRV storage, LRV light/heavy duty maintenance, bus/LRV body shop, machine shop, heavy duty diesel mechanical shop, LRV operator training, maintenance and equipment training
 Haysboro LRV Storage Site: LRV storage
 Oliver Bowen Maintenance Facility: LRV storage, LRV light/heavy duty maintenance, machine shop
 Stoney Garage: Conventional CNG bus storage and CNG fueling station.

Public Safety and Enforcement 

The Calgary Transit Public Safety and Enforcement Section (formerly the Calgary Transit Protective Services) is the enforcement agency for Calgary Transit. Formed in 1981, as special constables under the Police Act of Alberta, special constables had most authorities given to regular police constables. In 2008, the new Peace Officer Act replaced the old police act. Officers were then renamed as "peace officers" under this act and given full peace officer powers in the Province of Alberta.

Mandate 
The main duties of a Calgary Transit peace officer are to protect the public using the system, its employees and its assets. Officers must respond to requests for assistance from customers and employees which include arresting persons found committing criminal offences (indictable or summary conviction) on or in relation to Calgary Transit facilities, vehicles and property.

Other duties includes public education, regular patrols of the transit system, customer relations and issuance of violation tickets.

Officers 
PS&E peace officers have similar powers of a police officer to enforce federal statutes and various provincial statutes while in the execution of their specifically appointed duties, as they pertain to Calgary Transit property. Officers enforce the Criminal Code of Canada (CCC), the Gaming and Liquor Act of Alberta, the Traffic Safety Act of Alberta (TSA) – non-moving violations, the Provincial Offences and Procedures Act (POPA), Trespass to Premise Act (TPA), the Petty Trespass Act of Alberta and all municipal by-laws for the City of Calgary.

PS&E officers have a memorandum of understanding (MoU) with the Calgary Police Service that gives transit peace officers extended authority to arrest and detain individuals with outstanding warrants and execute these warrants. This extended authority also allows for transport of arrested individuals to the Calgary Court Services Section (CSS) or Calgary Remand Center (CRC).

Currently, the force deploys 71 officers with full peace officers status. All officers are equipped with handcuffs, OC spray, collapsible batons and protective body armour.

In June 2009, a new mountain bike unit of eight officers was created and deployed. Officers went through an intensive week-long training program through the internationally recognized Law Enforcement Bike Association (LEBA).

PS&E partners with the local municipal police force, Calgary Police Service, in enforcing laws in the Calgary area on transit properties. As with most agencies, PS&E utilizes its own radio service; and a centralized call taking and dispatch centre.

Commuter Rail 
Calgary Transit briefly experimented with a commuter train in 1996. The service consisted of a single line, running from a platform at 162 Avenue SW (present-day Somerset–Bridlewood station) to Anderson station (then the terminus of the South Line), where commuters could transfer to the CTrain network. Running every 20 minutes during the morning and evening rush hours, the free service carried an average of just over 800 people per day. The city didn't lay any new track, but ran the trains on the CPR freight line running alongside the South Line's tracks. Siemens RegioSprinter diesel multiple units were used as the rolling stock. With a top speed of 120 kilometres per hour, the train could cover the roughly 7 kilometres in a matter of minutes. The city ultimately decided not to implement permanent commuter rail. The CTrain system was later extended along the same corridor, with more stations and regular service.

In recent years, transit planners and some politicians have discussed adding commuter service to Airdrie, Cochrane, Okotoks, Strathmore and other nearby cities and towns, but no firm plans have been made.

References

External links 

Official Calgary Transit website
Photos of Calgary Transit vehicles and those of other transit authorities
Calgary Transit roster information wiki
Schedules using Google Maps
LRT in Calgary
Third Party Calgary Transit iPhone App
 (RouteAhead, Calgary Transit's 30-year plan)
2008 Calgary Transit Crime and Disorder Statistics

 
Railway companies established in 1909